Boragori is a village of Hooghly District under Pandua police station and Berela-Kochmali Gram Panchayet in West Bengal.
Boragori is the only village in this area that has 100% Hindu population.

Geography 
Boragori is located in 23.130805N, 88.162985E. It has an average elevation of 20.5 meters. This village surrounded by some villages, Panpara, Gokuldanga to the north, Berela, Abodpara, Moglompur to the south, Kochmali to the east, Debipur and Burdwan District to the west. By road Boragori is connected by G.T Road SH 13 (formerly NH 2B). Boragori is the last village of Hooghly District to the north, border of Burdwan District. The nearest rail station is Debipur, Memari I. Boinchi is the nearest major town that is connected with Boragori by GT Road.

Demographics 
Boragori has an average literacy rate of 70.80%.
100% Hindu population

Facilities and rducation 
This village has one primary school "Boragori S.N Primary School"  one health center. and two Cold Storage.

Attraction
Balir khad is the main attraction of Boragori. It is a very famous picnic spot. Balir khad is situated to the south of GT Road.

Temples and deity
Maa Kali Mata or Maa Manasha mandir is situated in this village. Baba Gopikanta, main deity of Roy family of this village, it is a around 800 years old statue. There are 3 old terracotta temples situated.

Economy 
This village is covered by pure agricultural lands. In this village there are two Cold Storages, one milk factory, a cotton factory, and many different types of small industries. Kochmali-Boragori Krishi Unnayan Samabay Samity Ltd. is a co-operative bank of this village. Economically healthy. This co-operative is dealer of Hindustan Petroleum, IFFCO.

References

Villages in Hooghly district